Stainless may refer to:
 Stainless steel, a corrosion-resistant metal alloy
 Stainless Games, a British video game developer
 Stainless Broadcasting Company, a TV broadcaster based in Michigan, US
 Stainless Banner, the second national flag of the Confederate States of America